This Is a Journey...Into Time is a live album released in 1993 by the Washington, D.C.-based go-go band Chuck Brown & the Soul Searchers. The album consists go-go renditions of classic jazz and swing songs performed with a go-go beat.

Track listing

Personnel
 Chuck Brown – lead vocals, electric guitar
 William "Ju Ju" House – drums
 Heartbeat – congas
 Glenn Ellis –bass guitar, percussions
 Dr. Louie Oxley – electronic keyboards
 Greg Thomas  – tenor saxophone
 Greg Boyer – trombone
 Bennie Cowan – trumpet

References

External links
This Is a Journey...Into Time at Discogs

1993 live albums
Chuck Brown albums
Live jazz-funk albums